The Nitti II government of Italy held office from 22 May until 10 June 1920, a total of 19 days. It is one of the shortest governments in Italian history.

Government parties
The government was composed by the following parties:

Composition

References

Italian governments
1920 establishments in Italy